Basedowena hinsbyi is a species of air-breathing land snail, a terrestrial pulmonate gastropod mollusc in the family Camaenidae. 

This species is endemic to New South Wales,  Australia.

References

External links
 Gude, G. K. (1916). Descriptions of two new species of Angasella. Proceedings of the Malacological Society of London. 12: 41-42
 Criscione F. & Köhler F. (2016). Phylogenetic systematics of the land snail Basedowena from the Australian arid zone: taxonomic revision with description of new taxa (Stylommatophora : Camaenidae). Invertebrate Systematics. 30: 370-386.

Vulnerable fauna of Australia
Gastropods described in 1916
Camaenidae